Marcello Campolonghi (born 15 February 1975) is an Italian former footballer who played as a forward.

Throughout his career he played for several teams in the Italian Serie B.

External links
 

1975 births
Living people
Italian footballers
Serie B players
Piacenza Calcio 1919 players
Brescia Calcio players
A.C. Monza players
U.S. Lecce players
A.C. Cesena players
A.C.N. Siena 1904 players
F.C. Crotone players
A.C. Reggiana 1919 players
Como 1907 players
U.S. Cremonese players
A.S. Pizzighettone players
F.C. Pavia players
Association football forwards
S.S. Maceratese 1922 players
Mediterranean Games gold medalists for Italy
Mediterranean Games medalists in football
Competitors at the 1997 Mediterranean Games